This is a list of novelists from the United States, listed with titles of a major work for each.

This is not intended to be a list of every American (born U.S. citizen, naturalized citizen, or long-time resident alien) who has published a novel. (For the purposes of this article, novel is defined as an extended work of fiction. This definition is loosely interpreted to include novellas, novelettes, and books of interconnected short stories.) Novelists on this list have achieved a notability that exceeds merely having been published. The writers on the current list fall into one or more of the following categories:

 All American novelists who have articles in Wikipedia should be on this list, and even if they do not clearly meet any other criteria they should not be removed until the article itself is removed.
 Winner of a major literary prize, even if the winning work was a story collection rather than a novel: The Pulitzer Prize, The PEN American Center Book Awards, the National Book Award, the American Book Award, the National Book Critics Circle Award, the Orange Prize, and some others. (Note: The only Pulitzer winner for Fiction not on the list is James Alan McPherson, who has never published a novel.)
 Having a substantial body of work, widely respected and reviewed in major publications, and perhaps often nominated or a finalist for major awards.
 A pioneering literary figure, possibly for the style or substance of their entire body of work, or for a single novel that was a notable "first" of some kind in U.S. literary history.
 Had several massive bestsellers, or even just one huge seller that has entered the cultural lexicon (Grace Metalious and Peyton Place, for example).
 A leading figure—especially award-winning, and with crossover appeal to mainstream readers, reviewers, and scholars—in a major genre or subcategory of fiction: Romance, science fiction, fantasy, horror, mystery, western, young adult fiction, regional or "local color" fiction, proletarian fiction, etc.

A 

 Patricia Aakhus (1952–2012), The Voyage of Mael Duin's Curragh
 Atia Abawi
 Edward Abbey (1927–1989), The Monkey Wrench Gang
 Lynn Abbey (born 1948), Daughter of the Bright Moon
 Belle Kendrick Abbott (1842–1893), Leah Mordecai
 Eleanor Hallowell Abbott (1872–1958), poet, novelist and short story writer
 Hailey Abbott, Summer Boys
 Megan Abbott (born 1971), Die A Little
 Shana Abé, A Rose in Winter
 Louise Abeita (1926–2014), Native American Isleta Pueblo writer, I am a Pueblo Indian Girl
 Robert H. Abel (1941–2017)
 Aberjhani
 Walter Abish (1931–2022), How German Is It
 Abiola Abrams (born 1976), TV host, art filmmaker and author, Dare
 Diana Abu-Jaber (born 1960), Arabian Jazz
 Susan Abulhawa, Mornings in Jenin
 Kathy Acker (1947–1997), Blood and Guts in High School
 Cherry Adair, Black Magic
 Alice Adams (1926–1999), Beautiful Girl
 Henry Adams (1838–1918), Democracy: An American Novel
 Yda Addis (1857–1902), writer and translator
 Kim Addonizio (born 1954), poet, novelist
 George Ade (1866–1944), The Slim Princess
 Renata Adler (born 1938), Speedboat
 Warren Adler (1927–2019), The War of the Roses
 James Agee (1909–1955), A Death in the Family
 Charlotte Agell (born 1959), novelist and children's writer
 Kelli Russell Agodon (born 1969), poet, writer, and editor
 Conrad Aiken (1889–1973), Blue Voyage
 Hiag Akmakjian (1926–2017)
 Mitch Albom (born 1958), The Five People You Meet in Heaven
 Kathleen Alcalá (born 1954), Spirits of the Ordinary
 Louisa May Alcott (1832–1888), Little Women
 Isabella Macdonald Alden (1841–1930), children's writer
 Clifford Lindsey Alderman (1902–1988)
 Thomas Bailey Aldrich (1836–1907), Prudence Palfrey
 Malin Alegria
 Lloyd Alexander (1924–2007), The Black Cauldron
 Tasha Alexander (born 1969)
 Sherman Alexie (born 1966), Reservation Blues
 Horatio Alger Jr. (1832–1899), Ragged Dick
 Nelson Algren (1909–1981), The Man with the Golden Arm
 Hervey Allen (1889–1949), Anthony Adverse
 Isabel Allende (born 1942), Chilean/American novelist, Eva Luna, Daughter of Fortune
 Dorothy Allison (born 1949), Bastard Out of Carolina
 Lisa Alther (born 1944), Kinflicks
 Joseph Alexander Altsheler (1862–1919), The Young Trailers
 Julia Alvarez (born 1950), How the García Girls Lost Their Accents
 Rudolfo Anaya (1937–2020), Bless Me, Ultima
 Laurie Halse Anderson (born 1961), Speak
 Poul Anderson (1926–2001), Tau Zero
 Sherwood Anderson (1876–1941), Winesburg, Ohio
 Eliza Frances Andrews (1840–1931), novelist and Civil War writer
 V. C. Andrews (1923–1986), Flowers in the Attic
 Tina McElroy Ansa (born 1949), Baby of the Family
 A. Manette Ansay (born 1964), Vinegar Hill
 Donald Antrim (born 1959), The Hundred Brothers
 Gloria E. Anzaldúa (1942–2004), author, poet and activist, Borderlands/La Frontera: The New Mestiza
 Allen Appel (born 1945), Time After Time
 Benjamin Appel (1907–1979), Brain Guy
 Max Apple (born 1941), Zip: A Novel of the Left and the Right
 Harold Hunter Armstrong (1884–1979)
 Harriette Arnow (1908–1986), The Dollmaker
 Timothy Shay Arthur (1809–1885), Ten Nights in a Bar-Room and What I Saw There
 Sholem Asch (1880–1957), The Nazarene
 Inez Asher (1911–2006), television writer and novelist, Family Sins
 Kristen Ashley (born 1968)
 Anastasia Ashman (born 1964), author and cultural producer, Tales from the Expat Harem
 Isaac Asimov (1920–1992), The Gods Themselves
 Rilla Askew (born 1951), The Mercy Seat
 Robert Asprin (1946–2008), Another Fine Myth
 Gertrude Atherton (1857–1948), The Conqueror
 Eleanor Stackhouse Atkinson (1863–1942), author, journalist and teacher
 William Attaway (1911–1986), Blood on the Forge
 Amelia Atwater-Rhodes (born 1984), In the Forests of the Night
 Louis Auchincloss (1917–2010), The Rector of Justin
 Jean M. Auel (born 1936), The Clan of the Cave Bear
 Paul Auster (born 1947), New York Trilogy
 Mary Hunter Austin (1868–1934), Isidro

 Victoria Aveyard (born 1990), Red Queen series

B 

 James Baar (1929–2021)
 Sanora Babb (1907–2005)
 C. Morgan Babst (born 1980)
 Richard Bach (born 1936), Jonathan Livingston Seagull
 Irving Bacheller (1859–1950), A Man for the Ages
 George Bagby (1906–1985), Murder at the Piano
 Dorothy Baker (1907–1968), Young Man with a Horn
 James Robert Baker (1947–1997), Fuel-Injected Dreams
 Nicholson Baker (born 1957), Vox
 Kirsten Bakis (born 1968), Lives of the Monster Dogs
 Faith Baldwin (1893–1978), The Heart Has Wings
 James Baldwin (1924–1987), Go Tell It on the Mountain
 Leigh Bale
 John Ball (1911–1988), In the Heat of the Night
 Toni Cade Bambara (1939–1995), The Salt Eaters
 Anna Banks
 Russell Banks (born 1940), The Sweet Hereafter
 Margaret Culkin Banning (1891–1982), Country Club People
 Amiri Baraka (LeRoi Jones) (1934–2014), The System of Dante's Hell
 Tom Barbash, The Last Good Chance
 Anna Maynard Barbour (died 1941), That Mainwaring Affair
 John Franklin Bardin (1916–1981), Devil Take the Blue-Tail Fly
 Brad Barkley (born 1961), Money, Love
 Annie Maria Barnes (1857 – unknown), Some lowly lives and the heights they reached
 Djuna Barnes (1892–1982), Nightwood
 Linda Barnes (born 1949), A Trouble of Fools
 Margaret Ayer Barnes (1886–1967), Years of Grace
 Steven Barnes (born 1952), The Legacy of Heorot (co-author)
 Wilton Barnhardt (born 1960), Gospel
 Amelia Edith Huddleston Barr (1831–1919), Jan Vedder's Wife
 Nevada Barr (born 1952), Track of the Cat
 Stringfellow Barr (1897–1982),
 Andrea Barrett (born 1964), The Voyage of the Narwhal
 John Barth (born 1930), Giles Goat-Boy
 Donald Barthelme (1931–1989), Snow White
 Frederick Barthelme (born 1943), Chroma
 Alice E. Bartlett (1848-1920), Until the Daybreak
 Nalbro Bartley (1888–1952), A Woman's Woman
 Fredrick Barton
 Rick Bass (born 1958), Where the Sea Used to Be
 Sara Ware Bassett (1872–1968)
 Hamilton Basso (1904–1964), The View from Pompey's Head
 Harriet Bates (1856–1886), wrote under the name Eleanor Putnam
 Margret Holmes Bates (1844-1927), Manitou
 Emma Pow Bauder (1848-1932), The Inhabitants of Two Worlds
 L. Frank Baum (1856–1919), The Wonderful Wizard of Oz
 Beth Ann Bauman
 Richard Bausch (born 1945), The Last Good Time
 Robert Bausch (1945–2018), Almighty Me
 Charles Baxter (born 1947), Shadow Play
 Jonathan Bayliss (1926–2009), the fiction tetralogy Gloucesterman
 Peter S. Beagle (born 1939), The Last Unicorn
 Theodore Beale (born 1968), The War in Heaven, The Eternal Warriors
 Greg Bear (1951-2022), Darwin's Radio
 Ann Beattie (born 1947), Chilly Scenes of Winter
 Paul Beatty (born 1962), The Sellout (novel)
 Jessica Beck
 Louis Begley (born 1933), About Schmidt
 Madison Smartt Bell (born 1957), All Souls' Rising
 Edward Bellamy (1850–1898), Looking Backward: 2000–1887
 Saul Bellow (1915–2005), Henderson the Rain King
 Peter Benchley (1940–2006), Jaws
 Aimee Bender (born 1969), An Invisible Sign of My Own
 Pinckney Benedict (born 1964), Dogs of God
 Stephen Vincent Benét (1898–1943), Spanish Bayonet
 Gregory Benford (born 1941), Timescape
 Gary L. Bennett (born 1940), The Star Sailors
 Jenn Bennett
 Marcia Joanne Bennett (born 1945)
 Thomas Berger (1924–2014), Little Big Man
 Gina Berriault (1926–1999), The Descent
 Don Berry (1931–2001), Trask
 Wendell Berry (born 1934), A Place on Earth
 Alfred Bester (1913–1987), The Demolished Man
 Doris Betts (1932–2012), Souls Raised from the Dead
 Kiran Bhat (born 1990)
 Earl Derr Biggers (1884–1933), The Chinese Parrot
 Jessica Bird (born 1969), Black Dagger Brotherhood series
 Robert Montgomery Bird (1803–1854), Nick of the Woods
 Michael Bishop (born 1945), No Enemy But Time
 Pam Blackwell (born 1942)
 William Peter Blatty (1928–2017), The Exorcist
 Winfred Blevins (born 1938), Stone Song, Story of the Life of Crazy Horse
 Robert Bloch (1917–1994), Psycho
 Francesca Lia Block (born 1962) Weetzie Bat
 Lawrence Block (born 1938), Eight Million Ways to Die
 Stefan Merrill Block (born 1982)
 Mabel Fuller Blodgett (1869–1959)
 Joan Blondell (1906–1979), Center Door Fancy
 Amy Bloom (born 1953), Love Invents Us
 V.O. Blum (born 1945), DownMind
 Judy Blume (born 1938), Are You There, God? It's Me, Margaret
 Tom Boggs (1905–1952)
 Chris Bohjalian (born 1960), The Law of Similars
 Jamie Pastor Bolnick
 Jamie Pastor Bolnick (born Huntington)
 Arna Bontemps (1902–1973), God Sends Sunday
 Kola Boof
 Emma Scarr Booth (1835-1927), Karan Kringle's Journal
 Anthony Boucher (1911–1968), The Case of the Seven of Calvary
 Vance Bourjaily (1922–2010), Brill Among the Ruins
 Ben Bova (1932–2020), The Starcrossed
 Jane Bowles (1917–1973), Two Serious Ladies
 Paul Bowles (1910–1999), The Sheltering Sky
 Valerie Bowman
 Blanche McCrary Boyd (born 1945), The Revolution of Little Girls
 James Boyd (1888–1944), Drums
 Jennifer Finney Boylan (previously James Finney Boylan) (born 1958), The Planets
 Roger Boylan (born 1951), Killoyle
 Kay Boyle (1902–1992), Death of a Man
 T. Coraghessan Boyle (born 1948), The Road to Wellville
 Virginia Frazer Boyle (1863-1938)
 Gerald Warner Brace (1901–1978), The World of Carrick's Cove
 Hugh Henry Brackenridge (1748–1816), Modern Chivalry
 Leigh Brackett (1915–1978), The Secret of Sinharat
 Ray Bradbury (1920–2012), The Illustrated Man
 David Bradley (born 1950), The Chaneysville Incident
 Marion Zimmer Bradley (1930–1999), The Mists of Avalon
 Billy Lee Brammer (1929–1978), The Gay Place
 Max Brand (1892–1944), Destry Rides Again
 Giannina Braschi (born 1954), Yo-Yo Boing!
 Richard Brautigan (1935–1984), Trout Fishing in America
 Kate Braverman (1949–2019), Lithium for Medea
 Anna de Brémont (c. 1856–1922)
 Sandra Bretting
 Matt Briggs (born 1970), Shoot the Buffalo
 David Brin (born 1950), The Uplift War
 Robert O'Neil Bristow (1926–2018)
 Poppy Z. Brite (born 1967), Exquisite Corpse
 Amber Brock (born 1980)
 Harold Brodkey (1930–1996), The Runaway Soul
 Louis Bromfield (1896–1956), The Rains Came
 Geraldine Brooks (born 1955), March
 Terry Brooks (born 1944), The Sword of Shannara
 Alice Brown (1857–1948), Fools of Nature
 Charles Brockden Brown (1771–1810), Wieland
 Dan Brown (born 1964), The Da Vinci Code
 Don Brown (born 1960), Treason
 Eleanor Brown (born 1969), The Weird Sisters
 Harry Brown (1917–1986), A Walk in the Sun
 Larry Brown (1951–2004), Dirty Work
 Rita Mae Brown (born 1944), Rubyfruit Jungle
 Rosellen Brown (born 1939), Before and After
 William Hill Brown (1756–1793), The Power of Sympathy
 Steven Brust (born 1955), the Dragaera series
 Pearl S. Buck (1892–1973), The Good Earth
 Michael Buckley (born 1969), The Sisters Grimm series
 Frederick Buechner (1926–2022), Godric
 Charles Bukowski (1920–1994), Factotum
 Emma Bull (born 1954), War for the Oaks
 Edward Bunker (1933–2005), Little Boy Blue
 Eugene Burdick (1918–1965), The Ugly American (with William Lederer)
 James Lee Burke (born 1936), The Neon Rain
 Frances Hodgson Burnett (1849–1924), Little Lord Fauntleroy
 William R. Burnett (1899–1982), Little Caesar
 Clara Louise Burnham (1854-1927), Jewel: A Chapter in Her Life
 Olive Ann Burns (1924–1990), Cold Sassy Tree
 Edgar Rice Burroughs (1875–1950), Tarzan of the Apes
 William S. Burroughs (1914–1997), Naked Lunch
 Frederick Busch (1941–2006), Harry and Catherine
 Gary Buslik (born 1946)
 Octavia E. Butler (1947–2006), Patternmaster
 Robert Olen Butler (born 1945), The Alleys of Eden
 Martha Haines Butt (1833-1871), Antifanaticism
 Elizabeth Byrd (1912–1989)

C 

 George Washington Cable (1844–1925), The Grandissimes
 Meg Cabot (born 1967), The Princess Diaries
 Abraham Cahan (1860–1951), The Rise of David Levinsky
 Chelsea Cain (born 1972), Heartsick
 James M. Cain (1892–1977), The Postman Always Rings Twice
 Erskine Caldwell (1903–1987), God's Little Acre
 Taylor Caldwell (1900–1985), Dynasty of Death
 Wayne Caldwell (born 1948)
 Hortense Calisher (1911–2009), False Entry
 Sophia Alice Callahan (1868-1894), Wynema, a Child of the Forest
 Bebe Moore Campbell (1950–2006), Singing in the Comeback Choir
 Helen Stuart Campbell (1839-1918), Ballantyne - a novel
 John W. Campbell (1910–1971), The Mightiest Machine
 Ethan Canin (born 1960), For Kings and Planets
 Robert Cantwell (1908–1978), The Land of Plenty
 Kevin Canty (born 1953), Nine Below Zero
 Truman Capote (1924–1984), Other Voices, Other Rooms
 Philip Caputo (born 1941), Delcorso's Gallery
 Orson Scott Card (born 1951), Ender's Game
 Ruth Cardello
 Ron Carlson (born 1947), Betrayed by F. Scott Fitzgerald
 Don Carpenter (1931–1995), Hard Rain Falling
 Caleb Carr (born 1955), The Alienist
 John Dickson Carr (1906–1977), The Crooked Hinge
 Gail Carriger (born 1976), Soulless
 H. G. Carrillo (1960–2020)
 Gladys Hasty Carroll (1904–1999), As the Earth Turns
 Jonathan Carroll (born 1949), The Land of Laughs
 Ella Kaiser Carruth (1882–1974)
 Aimee Carter (born 1986)
 Forrest Carter (1925–1979), The Education of Little Tree
 Lin Carter (1930–1988), Sky Pirates of Callisto
 Xam Wilson Cartier (born 1949)
 John Casey (born 1939), Spartina
 Wiley Cash (born 1977)
 Vera Caspary (1899-1987), Laura
 R. V. Cassill (1919–2002), Dr. Cobb's Game
 Ana Castillo (born 1953), So Far from God
 Willa Cather (1873–1947), My Ántonia
 Dominic Certo, The Valor of Francesco D’Amini
 Michael Chabon (born 1964), The Amazing Adventures of Kavalier & Clay
 Nathan Keonaona Chai
 Jack L. Chalker (1944–2005), Midnight at the Well of Souls
 Marisha Chamberlin (born 1952)
 Robert W. Chambers (1865–1933), In the Quarter
 Jessie Chandler (born 1968), Bingo Barge Murder
 Raymond Chandler (1888–1959), The Big Sleep
 Henry Chang
 James Chapman (born 1955), Stet
 Fred Chappell (born 1936), Dagon
 Jerome Charyn (born 1937), Blue Eyes
 Mary Ellen Chase (1887–1973), Mary Peters
 Loretta Chase (born 1949), Lord of Scoundrels
 Ruth Chatterton (1892–1961)
 Stephen Chbosky (born 1970), The Perks of Being a Wallflower
 John Cheever (1912–1982), The Wapshot Chronicle
 Maxine Chernoff (born 1952), American Heaven
 Kelly Cherry (1940–2022), We Can Still Be Friends (novel)
 C. J. Cherryh (born 1942), Cyteen
 Charles W. Chesnutt (1858–1932), The Marrow of Tradition
 Alan Cheuse (1940–2015), The Grandmothers' Club
 Tracy Chevalier (born 1962), Girl with a Pearl Earring
 Lydia Maria Child (1802–1880), Hobomok
 Mark Childress (born 1957), Crazy in Alabama
 Kate Chopin (1851–1904), The Awakening
 Autumn Christian, Girl Like a Bomb
 April Christofferson
 Edgar Earl Christopher, The Invisibles
 Winston Churchill (1871–1947), Richard Carvel
 Carolyn Chute (born 1947), The Beans of Egypt, Maine
 Sandra Cisneros (born 1954), The House on Mango Street
 Tom Clancy (1947–2013), The Hunt for Red October
 Eleanor Clark (1913–1996), Baldur's Gate
 Florence Anderson Clark (1835-1918), Zenaida, a Romance
 Mary Higgins Clark (1927–2020), A Stranger is Watching
 Walter Van Tilburg Clark (1909–1971), The Ox-Bow Incident
 Isabel C. Clarke (died 1951)
 Jaime Clarke (born 1971), Garden Lakes
 Meg Waite Clayton (born 1959), The Wednesday Sisters
 Beverly Cleary (1916–2021), Ramona the Pest
 Jeremiah Clemens (1814–1865), Tobias Wilson
 Samuel Langhorne Clemens (see: Mark Twain)
 Hal Clement (1922–2003), Mission of Gravity
 Michelle Cliff (1946–2016), Abeng
 Ernest Cline (born 1972)
 Deborah Coates
 Robert M. Coates (1897–1973), The Eater of Darkness
 Harlan Coben (born 1962), Deal Breaker
 Colleen Coble
 Sarah Johnson Cocke (1865-1944)
 Marvin Cohen (born 1931), Others, Including Morstive Sternbump
 Kresley Cole
 Teju Cole (born 1975), Open City (novel)
 Manda Collins
 Laurie Colwin (1944–1992), Shine On, Bright and Dangerous Object
 Richard Condon (1915–1996), The Manchurian Candidate
 Evan S. Connell (1924–2013), Mrs. Bridge
 Michael Connelly (born 1956), Blood Work
 Frank Conroy (1936–2005), Body and Soul
 Pat Conroy (1945–2016), The Prince of Tides
 K. C. Constantine (born 1934), Upon Some Midnights Clear
 Robin Cook (born 1940), Coma
 John Esten Cooke (1830–1886), The Virginia Comedians
 Caroline B. Cooney (born 1947)  No Such Person
 Dennis Cooper (born 1953), Frisk
 Doug Cooper (born 1970)
 J. California Cooper (1931–2014), Some People, Some Other Place
 James Fenimore Cooper (1789–1851), The Last of the Mohicans
 Susan Rogers Cooper (born 1947)
 Robert Coover (born 1932), The Universal Baseball Association, Inc., J. Henry Waugh, Prop.
 Lucy Corin (born 1970), Everyday Psychokillers: A History for Girls
 Edwin Corle (1906–1956), Fig Tree John
 Robert Cormier (1925-2000), The Chocolate War
 Patricia Cornwell (born 1956), Postmortem
 Gay Courter (born 1944)
 James Gould Cozzens (1903–1978), Guard of Honor
 Robert Crais (born c. 1953), Hostage
 Stephen Crane (1871–1900), The Red Badge of Courage
 Bruce Harris Craven
 Margaret Craven (1901–1980), I Heard the Owl Call My Name
 Francis Marion Crawford (1854–1909), Saracinesca
 Harry Crews (1935–2012), Scar Lover
 Michael Crichton (1942–2008), Jurassic Park
 Robert Crichton (1925–1993), The Secret of Santa Vittoria
 Amanda Cross (1926–2003), The James Joyce Murder
 John Crowley (born 1942), Little, Big
 Jennifer Crusie (born 1949), Welcome to Temptation
 Chris Crutcher (born 1946), Staying Fat for Sarah Byrnes
 Maria Susanna Cummins (1827–1866), The Lamplighter
 Michael Cunningham (born 1952), The Hours
 Chris Culver 
 James Oliver Curwood (1878–1927), The Grizzly King
 Clive Cussler (1931–2020), Raise the Titanic!

D 

 L. Sprague de Camp (1907–2000), Lest Darkness Fall
 Edward Dahlberg (1900–1977), Bottom Dogs
 Madeleine Vinton Dahlgren (1825-1898), Democracy, an American novel
 Frances Brackett Damon (1857-1939), Idlewise
 Mark Z. Danielewski (born 1966), House of Leaves
 Edwidge Danticat (born 1969), Breath, Eyes, Memory
 Evan Dara, The Lost Scrapbook
 Guy Davenport (1927–2005), Da Vinci's Bicycle
 Marcia Davenport (1903–1994), East Side, West Side
 Iimani David (born 1969)
 Avram Davidson (1923–1993), The Phoenix and the Mirror
 Clyde Brion Davis (1894–1962), Nebraska Coast
 Dorothy Salisbury Davis (1916–2014), Death of an Old Sinner
 Genese Davis (born 1984)
 H. L. Davis (1894–1960), Honey in the Horn
 L. J. Davis, A Meaningful Life
 Richard Harding Davis (1864–1916), Soldiers of Fortune
 Terry Davis (born 1947), Vision Quest
 Jeffery Deaver (born 1950), The Bone Collector
 Ted Dekker (born 1962), ADAM
 Darren DeFrain (born 1967)
 Margaret Deland (1857–1945), John Ward, Preacher
 Samuel R. Delany (born 1942), Dhalgren, Hogg
 Don DeLillo (born 1936), White Noise
 Viña Delmar (1903–1990), Bad Girl
 Patrick Dennis (1921–1976), Auntie Mame
 August Derleth (1909–1971), The Memoirs of Solar Pons
 Amber Dermont
 Bree Despain (born 1979)
 Jude Deveraux (born 1947), A Knight in Shining Armor
 Pete Dexter (born 1943), Paris Trout
 Junot Diaz (born 1968), The Brief Wondrous Life of Oscar Wao
 Philip K. Dick (1928–1982), Do Androids Dream of Electric Sheep?
 James Dickey (1923–1997), Deliverance
 Charles Dickinson (born 1951), A Shortcut in Time
 Joan Didion (1934–2021), Play It as It Lays
 Karen Dionne (born 1953)
 Thomas M. Disch (1940–2008), Camp Concentration
 Chitra Banerjee Divakaruni (born 1956), The Mistress of Spices
 Melvin Dixon (1950–1992), Trouble the Water
 Stephen Dixon (1936–2019), Frog
 Thomas Dixon Jr. (1864–1946), The Clansman
 Moshe Dluznowsky
 Stephen Dobyns (born 1941), The Wrestler's Cruel Study
 E. L. Doctorow (1931–2015), Ragtime
 Anna Bowman Dodd (1858-1929), The Republic of the Future
 Mary Mapes Dodge (1831–1905), Hans Brinker
 Harriet Doerr (1910–2002), Stones for Ibarra
 Ivan Doig (1939–2015), Ride With Me, Mariah Montana
 John Dolan (born 1955), Shantee'
 Stephen R. Donaldson (born 1947), Lord Foul's Bane
 J. P. Donleavy (1926–2017), The Ginger Man
 Richard Dooling (born 1954), White Man's Grave
 Michael Dorris (1945–1997), A Yellow Raft in Blue Water
 Kathryn Adams Doty (1920–2016)
 Lloyd C. Douglas (1877–1951), Magnificent Obsession
 Christopher Dow (born 1950)
 Fanny Murdaugh Downing (1831-1894), Nameless, a novel
 J. Hyatt Downing (1888–1973)
 Theodore Dreiser (1871–1945), An American Tragedy
 Allen Drury (1918–1998), Advise and Consent
 Tom Drury (born 1956), The End of Vandalism
 Bruce Ducker (born 1938), Mooney in Flight
 John Dufresne (born 1948), Louisiana Power and Light
 David James Duncan (born 1952), The Brothers K
 Katherine Dunn (1945–2016), Geek Love
 John Gregory Dunne (1932–2003), True Confessions
 John Dunning (born 1942), Booked to Die
 John William De Forest (1826–1926), Miss Ravenel's Conversion from Secession to Loyalty
 H.D. (1886–1961), Palimpsest
 John Dos Passos (1896–1970), U.S.A.
 Lester del Rey (1915–1993), Attack from Atlantis
 Peter De Vries (1910–1993), Reuben, Reuben
 Andre Dubus III (born 1959), House of Sand and Fog
Jaycee Dugard, (born 1980) A Stolen Life: A Memoir

E 

 Mary Tracy Earle (1864-1955), The Wonderful Wheel
 Tony Earley (born 1961), Jim the Boy
 Mignon G. Eberhart (1899–1996), The Patient in Room 18
 David Eddings (1931–2008), Pawn of Prophecy
 Clyde Edgerton (born 1944), Walking Across Egypt
 Walter D. Edmonds (1903–1998), Drums Along the Mohawk
 George Alec Effinger (1947–2002), When Gravity Fails
 Jennifer Egan (born 1962), A Visit from the Goon Squad
 Dave Eggers (born 1970), You Shall Know Our Velocity
 Edward Eggleston (1837–1902), The Hoosier Schoolmaster
 John Ehle (1924–2018), Last One Home
 Jill Eisenstadt (born 1963), From Rockaway, Kiss Out, Swell
 Robert Elegant (born 1928), Dynasty
 Stanley Elkin (1930–1995), Mrs. Ted Bliss
 Aaron Elkins (born 1935), Old Bones
 Stanley Ellin (1916–1986), The Eighth Circle
 Bret Easton Ellis (born 1964), American Psycho, Glamorama
 Edward S. Ellis (1840–1916), Seth Jones; or, The Captives of the Frontier
 Trey Ellis (born 1962), Right Here, Right Now
 Ralph Ellison (1914–1994), Invisible Man
 James Ellroy (born 1948), L.A. Confidential
 Carol Emshwiller (1921–2019), Carmen Dog
 Susan Engberg
 Louise Erdrich (born 1954), Love Medicine
 Steve Erickson (born 1950), Arc d'X
 Payne Erskine (1854–1924)
 Andrew Ervin (born 1971), Burning Down George Orwell's House
 Loren D. Estleman (born 1952), Motor City Blue
 Jeffrey Eugenides (born 1960), The Virgin Suicides
 Janet Evanovich (born 1943), One For the Money
 Augusta Jane Evans Wilson (1835–1909), St. Elmo
 Lizzie P. Evans-Hansell (1836-1922), Aunt Nabby
 Richard Paul Evans (born 1962), The Christmas Box and Michael Vey series
 Frederick Exley (1929–1992), A Fan's Notes

F 

 Ann Fairbairn (1901–1972), Five Smooth Stones
 Janet Ayer Fairbank (1878–1951), The Bright Land
 Amber Fallon, horror writer
 John Fante (1909–1983), Wait Until Spring, Bandini
 Richard Fariña (1937–1966), Been Down So Long It Looks Like Up to Me
 Philip José Farmer (1918–2009), To Your Scattered Bodies Go
 James T. Farrell (1904–1979), Young Lonigan
 Howard Fast (1914–2003), April Morning
 William Faulkner (1897–1962), Light in August
 Jessie Redmon Fauset (1882–1961), Plum Bun: A Novel Without a Moral
 Jürgen Fauth (born 1969)
 Kenneth Fearing (1902–1961), The Big Clock
 Raymond Federman (1928–2009), The Twofold Vibration
 Raymond E. Feist (born 1945), Magician
 Edna Ferber (1885–1968), So Big
 Ira Lunan Ferguson (1904–1992)
 Harvey Fergusson (1890–1971), The Conquest of Don Pedro
 Rachel Field (1894–1942), All This, and Heaven Too
 Amanda Filipacchi (born 1967), Love Creeps
 Charles Finch (born 1980), A Beautiful Blue Death
 Martha Farquharson Finley (1828–1909), Elsie Dinsmore
 Jack Finney (1911–1995), Time and Again
 Dorothy Canfield Fisher (1879–1958), Understood Betsy
 Rudolph Fisher (1897-1934), The Walls of Jericho
 Vardis Fisher (1895–1968), Children of God
 Janet Fitch (born 1955), White Oleander
 F. Scott Fitzgerald (1896–1940), The Great Gatsby
 Louise Fitzhugh (1928–1974), Harriet the Spy
 Ambrose Flack (1902–1980)
 Raymond Flanagan (1903–1990), Three Religious Rebels. The Forefathers of the Trappists
 Thomas Flanagan (1923–2002), The Year of the French
 Martin Flavin (1883–1967), Journey in the Dark
 Paul Fleischman (born 1952), Whirligig
 Sid Fleischman (1920–2010), The Whipping Boy
 Lynn Flewelling (born 1958), Nightrunner
 Eilis Flynn
 Vince Flynn (1966–2013), Pursuit of Honor
 Jonathan Safran Foer (born 1977), Everything Is Illuminated
 Mary Hallock Foote (1847–1938), The Chosen Valley
 Shelby Foote (1916–2005), Shiloh
 Esther Forbes (1891–1967), Johnny Tremain
 Jesse Hill Ford (1928–1996), The Liberation of Lord Byron Jones
 John M. Ford (1957–2006), The Dragon Waiting
 Paul Leicester Ford (1865–1902), The Honorable Peter Stirling
 Richard Ford (born 1944), Independence Day
 Leon Forrest (1937–1997), There Is a Tree More Ancient Than Eden
 Robert Forward (1932–2002), Dragon's Egg
 Alan Dean Foster (born 1946), Midworld
 Hannah Webster Foster (1758–1840), The Coquette
 Karen Joy Fowler (born 1950), The Jane Austen Book Club
 John Fox Jr. (1862–1919), The Trail of the Lonesome Pine
 Michael J. Fox (born 1961), Lucky Man: A Memoir
 Paula Fox (1923–2017), Desperate Characters
 William Price Fox (1926–2015), Ruby Red
 Sohrab Homi Fracis
 Jacquelyn Frank
 Suzanne Frank
 Waldo Frank (1889–1967), Holiday
 Jonathan Franzen (born 1959), The Corrections
 Rhiannon Frater
 Charles Frazier (born 1950), Cold Mountain
 Harold Frederic (1856–1898), The Damnation of Theron Ware
 Mary Eleanor Wilkins Freeman (1852–1930), Pembroke
 Joseph Lewis French (18581936), Masterpieces of Mystery
 Marilyn French (1929–2009), The Women's Room
 William Aden French (1892–1980)
 Bruce Jay Friedman (1930–2020), Stern
 Kinky Friedman (born 1944), Greenwich Killing Time
 Daniel Fuchs (1909–1993), Summer in Williamsburg
 Andrew Fukuda
 Henry Blake Fuller (1857–1929), The Cliff-Dwellers
 Alan Furst (born 1941), Night Soldiers

G 

 Tom Gabbay (born 1953), The Berlin Conspiracy
 Ellen Gable (born 1959)
 William Gaddis (1922–1998), The Recognitions
 Ernest J. Gaines (1933–2019), The Autobiography of Miss Jane Pittman
 Mary Gaitskill (born 1954), Two Girls, Fat and Thin
 Zona Gale (1874–1938), Miss Lulu Bett
 Paul Gallico (1897–1976), The Poseidon Adventure
 Robert Gandt (born 1939)
 Ernest K. Gann (1910–1991), The High and the Mighty
 Cristina García (born 1958), Dreaming in Cuban
 John Reynolds Gardiner (1944–2006), Stone Fox
 Erle Stanley Gardner (1889–1970), The Case of the Velvet Claws
 John Gardner (1933–1982), Grendel
 Leonard Gardner (born 1933), Fat City
 Hamlin Garland (1860–1940), A Daughter of the Middle Border
 George Garrett (1929–2008), Death of the Fox
 Chloe Gartner (1916–2003), The Infidels
 Haley Elizabeth Garwood (born 1940), The Forgotten Queen
 Julie Garwood (born 1944), Ransom
 William H. Gass (1924–2017), Omensetter's Luck
 David Gates (born 1947), Jernigan
 William Gay (1941-2012)
 Elizabeth George (born 1949), A Great Deliverance
 Sarah Gerard
 Christien Gholson (born 1964), A Fish Trapped Inside the Wind
 Kaye Gibbons (born 1960), Ellen Foster
 William Gibson (born 1948), Neuromancer
 Scott G. Gier (born 1948)
 Barry Gifford (born 1946), Wild at Heart
 Annie Somers Gilchrist (1841-1912)
 Ellen Gilchrist (born 1935), Starcarbon
 Charlotte Perkins Gilman (1860–1935), Herland
 Florence Magruder Gilmore (1881-1945), The Parting of the Ways
 Susan Gregg Gilmore
 Mark Gilroy
 Fred Gipson (1908–1973), Old Yeller
 Ellen Glasgow (1873–1945), Virginia
 Julia Glass (born 1956), Three Junes
 Gail Godwin (born 1937), A Mother and Two Daughters
 Tom Godwin (1915–1980), ‘’The Survivors’’
 Herbert Gold (born 1924), The Man Who Was Not With It
 Arthur Golden (born 1957), Memoirs of a Geisha
 Francisco Goldman (born 1954), The Long Night of White Chickens
 William Goldman (1931–2018), The Princess Bride
 Rebecca Goldstein (born 1950), The Mind-Body Problem
 David Goodis (1917–1967), Down There
 Terry Goodkind (1948-2020), Wizard's First Rule
 Allegra Goodman (born 1967), The Family Markowitz
 Paul Goodman (1911–1972), Making Do
 Marcus Goodrich (1897–1991), Delilah
 H. B. Goodwin (1827-1893), The fortunes of Miss Follen
 Caroline Gordon (1895–1981), Aleck Maury, Sportsman
 Mary Gordon (born 1949), Final Payments
 Ron Goulart (1933–2022), After Things Fell Apart
 William Goyen (1915–1983), The Fair Sister
 Sue Grafton (1940–2017), "A" is for Alibi
 Robert Grant (1852–1940), Unleavened Bread
 Shirley Ann Grau (1929–2020), The Keepers of the House
 Charlotte E. Gray (1873–1926), Out of the Mire, The Jericho Road, The Inn by the Sea 
 Anna Katharine Green (1846–1935), The Leavenworth Case
 John Green (born 1977), The Fault in Our Stars
 Julien Green (1900–1998), Léviathan (The Dark Journey)
 Vincent S. Green (born 1953), The Price of Victory, Extreme Justice
 Joanne Greenberg (born 1932), I Never Promised You a Rose Garden
 Amy Greene (born 1975)
 Frances Nimmo Greene (1867-1937), The Right of the Strongest
 Sam Greenlee (1930–2014), The Spook Who Sat by the Door
 Andrew Sean Greer (born 1970), The Confessions of Max Tivoli
 William Lindsay Gresham (1909–1962), Nightmare Alley
 Zane Grey (1872–1939), Riders of the Purple Sage
 Eva Kinney Griffith (1852–1918), A Woman's Evangel
 Sutton E. Griggs (1872–1933), The Hindered Hand
 Martha Grimes (born 1931), The Old Contemptibles
 John Grisham (born 1955), The Firm
 Lauren Groff (born 1978), Fates and Furies
 Winston Groom (1943–2020), Forrest Gump
 Patricia Grossman (born 1951), Radiant Daughter
 Michael Grothaus (born 1977), Epiphany Jones
 Nikolai Grozni
 Davis Grubb (1919–1980), The Night of the Hunter
 Lisa Grunwald (born 1959), The Irresistible Henry House
 Lucrecia Guerrero, Chasing Shadows (linked short stories), Tree of Sighs
 Judith Guest (born 1936), Ordinary People
 Allan Gurganus (born 1947), Oldest Living Confederate Widow Tells All
 Naomi Gurian (born 1933)
 David Guterson (born 1956), Snow Falling on Cedars
 A. B. Guthrie Jr. (1901–1991), The Big Sky

H 

 John Habberton (1842-1921)
 Jessica Hagedorn (born 1949), Dogeaters
 Jennifer Haigh (born 1968), Mrs. Kimble
 Charles Haldeman (1931–1983)
 Joe Haldeman (born 1943), The Forever War
 Alex Haley (1921–1992), Roots
 James Norman Hall (1887–1951), Mutiny on the Bounty (with Charles Nordhoff)
 Oakley Hall (1920–2008), Warlock
 Brett Halliday (1904–1977), Dividend on Death
 Julie Halpern
 Hilary Thayer Hamann (born 1962), Anthropology of an American Girl
 Jane Hamilton (born 1957), The Book of Ruth
 Laurell K. Hamilton (born 1963), Guilty Pleasures
 Dashiell Hammett (1894–1961), The Maltese Falcon
 Samuel J. Hamrick (1929–2008)
 Cathi Hanauer (born 1962)
 Elizabeth Hand  (born 1957), Generation Loss
 Daniel Handler (Lemony Snicket) (born 1970), Watch Your Mouth
 Barry Hannah (1942–2010), Geromino Rex
 Joseph Hansen (1923–2004), Fadeout
 Ron Hansen (born 1947), Mariette in Ecstasy
 Paul Harding (born 1967), Tinkers
 Elizabeth Hardwick (1916–2007), Sleepless Nights
 Arthur Sherburne Hardy (1847–1930), The Wind of Destiny
 Donald Harington (1935–2009), The Cockroaches of Stay More
 Henry Harland (1861–1905), The Cardinal's Snuff-box
 Jean Harlow (1911–1937), Today is Tonight
 Charles L. Harness (1915–2005), The Paradox Men
 Kent Harrington
 Bertha Harris (1937–2005), Lover
 Charlaine Harris (born 1961), The Southern Vampire Mysteries
 Corra May Harris (1869–1935), The Circuit Rider's Wife
 MacDonald Harris (1921–1993), The Balloonist
 E. Lynn Harris (1955–2009), Invisible Life
 Jim Harris
 Mark Harris (1922–2007), Bang the Drum Slowly
 Thomas Harris (born 1940), The Silence of the Lambs
 Harry Harrison (1925–2012), Make Room! Make Room!
 Jim Harrison (1937–2016), Legends of the Fall
 Kathryn Harrison (born 1961), Exposure
 Kim Harrison (born 1966), Hollows
 Kent Haruf (1943–2014), Plainsong
 Adrienne Harun, A Man Came Out of a Door in the Mountain
 Jon Hassler (1933–2008), Staggerford
 Mary R. Platt Hatch (1848-1935), The Strange Disappearance of Eugene Comstocks
 Amanda Havard (born 1986)
 John Hawkes (1925–1998), The Lime Twig
 Alexandra Hawkins
 Nathaniel Hawthorne (1804–1864), The Scarlet Letter
 Ernest Haycox (1899–1950), Bugles in the Afternoon
 Shirley Hazzard (1931–2016), The Great Fire
 Shelby Hearon (1931–2016), Owning Jolene
 Peter Hedges (born 1962), What's Eating Gilbert Grape
 Rebecca Heflin (born 1963), Rescuing Lacey
 Ursula Hegi (born 1946), Stones from the River
 Scott Heim (born 1966), Mysterious Skin
 Larry Heinemann (1944–2019), Paco's Story
 Robert A. Heinlein (1907–1988), Stranger in a Strange Land
 Joseph Heller (1923–1999), Catch-22
 Mark Helprin (born 1947), Winter's Tale
 Ernest Hemingway (1899–1961), A Farewell to Arms
 Aleksandar Hemon (born 1964), Nowhere Man
 Helen Hemphill (born 1955)
 Dee Henderson (born ?), O'Malley Series
 James Hendryx, (1880–1963)
 Geoff Herbach
 Frank Herbert (1920–1986), Dune
 Joseph Hergesheimer (1880–1954), Linda Condon
 Nellie Hermann, The Season of Migration
 Robert Herrick (1868–1938), Web of Life
 John Hersey (1914–1993), A Bell for Adano
 Burton Hersh
 DuBose Heyward (1885–1940), Porgy
 Carl Hiaasen (born 1953), Sick Puppy
 George V. Higgins (1939–1999), The Friends of Eddie Coyle
 Wendy Higgins (born 1977)
 Patricia Highsmith (1921–1995), The Talented Mr. Ripley
 Oscar Hijuelos (1951–2013), The Mambo Kings Play Songs of Love
 Agnes Leonard Hill (1842-1917), Vanquished
 Tony Hillerman (1925–2008), The Blessing Way
 Joe Hilley (born 1956), Sober Justice, Double Take, Electric Beach, Night Rain, The Deposition, What the Red Moon Knows
 Chester Himes (1909–1984), If He Hollers Let Him Go
 S. E. Hinton (born 1948), The Outsiders
 Kathleen Hirsch (born 1953)
 Tami Hoag (born 1959), Ashes to Ashes
 Russell Hoban (1925–2011), Riddley Walker
 Laura Z. Hobson (1900–1986), Gentleman's Agreement
 Allen Hoey (1952–2010), Chasing the Dragon
 Alice Hoffman (born 1952), Practical Magic
 Cara Hoffman, So Much Pretty
 Lynn Hoffman (born 1997)
 Linda Hogan (writer) (born 1947), People of the Whale
 Nancy Holder (born 1953)
 Josiah Gilbert Holland (1819–1881), The Bay-Path
 Jenny Hollowell
 Sheri Holman (born 1966), The Mammoth Cheese
 Mary Jane Holmes (1825–1907), Lena Rivers
 Oliver Wendell Holmes (1809–1894), Elsie Venner
 A. M. Homes (born 1961), The End of Alice
 Ann Hood (born 1956), Somewhere Off the Coast of Maine
 David L. Hoof (born 1945)
 Khaled Hosseini (born 1965), The Kite Runner
 Silas House (born 1971), A Parchment of Leaves
 Blanche Willis Howard (1847–1898), Guenn: A Wave on the Breton Coast
 Linda Howard (born 1950)
 Maureen Howard (born 1930), Natural History
 E. W. Howe (1853–1937), The Story of a Country Town
 William Dean Howells (1837–1920), The Rise of Silas Lapham
 Elizabeth Hoyt (born 1970)
 George Hrab (born 1971), “Spiritual Healing & Balance Through Colonic Regularity” 
 Yang Huang (born 1971)
 David Huddle (born 1942), La Tour Dreams of the Wolf Girl
 Barry Hughart (1934–2019), Bridge of Birds
 Langston Hughes (1902–1967), Not Without Laughter
 William Humphrey (1924–1997), Farther Off from Heaven
 Josephine Humphreys (born 1945), Rich in Love
 Samantha Hunt (born 1971), The Invention of Everything Else
 Evan Hunter (1926–2005), Blackboard Jungle
 Jessie Prichard Hunter
 Stephen Hunter (born 1946), Point of Impact
 Fannie Hurst (1885–1968), Imitation of Life
 Zora Neale Hurston (1891–1960), Their Eyes Were Watching God
 Siri Hustvedt (born 1955), The Sorrows of an American
 James Hynes (born 1955), The Lecturer's Tale

I 

 David Ignatius (born 1950),
 Greg Iles (born 1960), The Quiet Game
 Bravig Imbs (1904–1944), The Professor's Wife
 Gary Indiana (born 1950), Resentment
 Rachel Ingalls (1940–2019), Mrs. Caliban
 William Inge (1913–1973), Good Luck, Miss Wyckoff
 Joseph Holt Ingraham (1809–1860), Lafitte: The Pirate of the Gulf
 Prentiss Ingraham (1843–1904), The Masked Spy
 Robert Inman (1931–2006)
 Lee Irby (born 1963), The Up and Up
 Clifford Irving (1930–2017)
 John Irving (born 1942), The World According to Garp
 Susan Isaacs (born 1943), Compromising Positions
 Lynn Isenberg, My Life Undercover
 Christopher Isherwood (1904–1986), Goodbye to Berlin
 Arturo Islas (1938–1991), The Rain God
 Alan Isler (1934–2010)

J 

 Beverley Jackson
 Brenda Jackson
 Charles R. Jackson (1902–1968), The Lost Weekend
 Helen Hunt Jackson (1830–1885), Ramona
 Shirley Jackson (1916–1965), The Haunting of Hill House
 Rona Jaffe (1932–2005), Mazes and Monsters
 John Jakes (born 1932), North and South
 Henry James (1843–1916), Washington Square
 Will James (1892–1942), Smoky the Cow Horse
 Elizabeth Janeway (1913–2005), Daisy Kenyon
 Tama Janowitz (born 1957), By the Shores of Gitchee Gumee
 Randall Jarrell (1914–1965), Pictures from an Institution
 Rosa Vertner Jeffrey (1828-1894), Woodburn
 Gish Jen (born 1956), Typical American
 Jerry B. Jenkins (born 1949), Left Behind (with Tim LaHaye)
 Gary Jennings (1928–1999), Aztec
 Caroline Howard Jervey (1823-1877), Helen Courtenay's Promise
 Sarah Orne Jewett (1849–1909), The Country of the Pointed Firs
 Ha Jin (born 1956), Waiting
 Adam Johnson (born 1967), Parasites Like Us
 Charles R. Johnson (born 1948), Middle Passage
 Denis Johnson (1949–2017), Fiskadoro
 Diane Johnson (born 1934), Le Divorce
 James Weldon Johnson (1871–1938), The Autobiography of an Ex-Colored Man
 Josephine Winslow Johnson (1910–1990), Now in November
 Joyce Johnson (born 1935), In the Night Café
 Maud Johnson (died 1985)
 Owen Johnson (1878–1952), Stover at Yale
 RM Johnson (born 1968)
 Maria I. Johnston (1835-1921)
 Mary Johnston (1870–1936), To Have and to Hold
 LeRoi Jones (see: Amiri Baraka)
 Edward P. Jones (born 1951), The Known World
 Gayl Jones (born 1949), Corregidora
 James Jones (1921–1977), From Here to Eternity
 Matthew F. Jones (born 19??), A Single Shot
 Stephen Graham Jones (born 1972), The Only Good Indians
 Erica Jong (born 1942), Fear of Flying
 Robert Jordan (1948–2007), The Eye of the World
 Sylvester Judd (1813–1853), Margaret
 Heidi Julavits (born 1968), The Mineral Palace
 Ward Just (1935–2019), Jack Gance

K 

 Cihan Kaan (born 1976)
 Stacey Kade, The Ghost and The Goth
 James Otis Kaler (1848–1912), Toby Tyler; or, Ten Weeks with a Circus
 Richard Kalich, The Nihilesthete
 Stuart M. Kaminsky (1934–2009), Cold Red Sunrise
 Joseph Kanon (born 1946), Los Alamos
 MacKinlay Kantor (1904–1977), Andersonville
 Vim Karénine  (born 1935), O America!
 Jan Karon (born 1937), At Home in Mitford
 Alma Katsu (born 1959)
 Illana Katz (born 1948)
 John Katzenbach (born 1950), The Madman's Tale
 Janet Kauffman (born 1945), Collaborators
 Bel Kaufman (1911–2014), Up the Down Staircase
 Sue Kaufman (1926–1977), Diary of a Mad Housewife
 John Keeble (born 1944)
 Harry Stephen Keeler (1890–1967), The Riddle of the Traveling Skull
 Clarence Budington Kelland (1881–1964), Dangerous Angel
 Faye Kellerman (born 1952), The Ritual Bath
 Jesse Kellerman (born 1978), The Executor
 Jonathan Kellerman (born 1949), Flesh and Blood
 William Melvin Kelley (1937–2017), A Different Drummer
 Marjorie Kellogg (1922–2005), Tell Me That You Love Me, Junie Moon
 Nic Kelman
 Elmer Kelton (1926–2009), Buffalo Wagons
 Anna Kendrick (born 1985), Scrappy Little Nobody
 John P. Kennedy (1795–1870), Horse-Shoe Robinson
 William Kennedy (born 1928), Ironweed
 Camilla Kenyon (1876–1957), Spanish Doubloons
 Jack Kerouac (1922–1969), On the Road
 Ken Kesey (1935–2001), One Flew Over the Cuckoo's Nest
 Jack Ketchum (1946–2018), The Girl Next Door
 Daniel Keyes (1927–2014), Flowers for Algernon
 Frances Parkinson Keyes (1885–1970), Dinner at Antoine's
 Harriette A. Keyser (1841-1936)
 Sue Monk Kidd (born 1948), The Secret Life of Bees
 Kristy Kiernan
 Karen Kijewski (born 1943), Katwalk
 Haven Kimmel (born 1965), The Solace of Leaving Early
 Jamaica Kincaid (born 1949), Annie John
 Grace King (1852–1932), The Pleasant Ways of St. Médard
 Laurie R. King (born 1952), A Grave Talent
 Stephen King (born 1947), Carrie
 Barbara Kingsolver (born 1955), The Bean Trees
 Maxine Hong Kingston (born 1940), Tripmaster Monkey
 Jeff Kinney (born 1971), Diary of a Wimpy Kid
 Joseph Kirkland (1830–1894), Zury: The Meanest Man in Spring County
 Walter Kirn (born 1962), Thumbsucker
 James Kisner (1947–2008)
 Lisa Kleypas (born 1964), Christmas Eve at Friday Harbor
 Fletcher Knebel (1911–1993), Seven Days in May (with Charles Bailey II)
 John Knowles (1926–2001), A Separate Peace
 Deborah Copaken Kogan (born 1966), The Red Book
 Manuel Komroff (1890–1974), Coronet
 Juliet Kono
 Dean Koontz (born 1945), Whispers
 Cyril Kornbluth, The Space Merchants (with Frederik Pohl
 Jerzy Kosinski (1933–1991), Being There
 William Kotzwinkle (born 1943), The Fan Man
 Eric Kraft (born 1945), What a Piece of Work I Am
 Kieran Kramer
 Larry Kramer (1935–2020), Faggots
 William Krasner (1917–2003)
 Herbert Krause (1905–1976), The Thresher
 Jayne Ann Krentz (born 1948), Sharp Edges
 Gary Krist (born 1957), Extravagance
 Tom Kromer (1906–1969), Waiting for Nothing
 William Kent Krueger (born 1950), Ordinary Grace
 Jim Krusoe (born 1942), The Girl Factory
 Maxine Kumin (1925–2014), Through Dooms of Love
 Lynn Kurland
 Allen Kurzweil (born 1960), A Case of Curiosities
 Rachel Kushner (born 1968), The Flamethrowers

L 

 Christopher La Farge (1897–1956), The Sudden Guest
 Oliver La Farge (1901–1963), Laughing Boy
 Ursula K. Le Guin (1929–2018), The Left Hand of Darkness
 Mercedes Lackey (born 1950), Arrows of the Queen
 Ed Lacy (1911–1968), Room To Swing
 R. A. Lafferty (1914–2002), Past Master
 Tim LaHaye (1926–2016), Left Behind (with Jerry B. Jenkins)
 Jhumpa Lahiri (born 1967), The Namesake
 Lori L. Lake (born 1960), Snow Moon Rising
 Harold Lamb (1892–1962), Marching Sands
 Wally Lamb (born 1950), She's Come Undone
 Anne Lamott (born 1954), Crooked Little Heart
 Louis L'Amour (1908–1988), Jubal Sackett
Woodrow Landfair (born 1982), "Land Of The Free"
 Margaret Landon (1903–1993), Anna and the King of Siam
 W. Patrick Lang (born 1940),  The Butcher's Cleaver
 Jane Langton (1922–2018), The Transcendental Murder
 Joe R. Lansdale (born 1951), The Bottoms
 Ring Lardner (1885–1933), You Know Me Al
 Jeremy Larner (born 1937), Drive, He Said
 Jeanne Larsen (born 1950), Silk Road
 Nella Larsen (1891–1964), Passing
 Robert Lasner
 Emma Lathen (Martha Hennissart (born 1929) and Mary JaneLatsis (1927–1997)), Murder Against the Grain
 Keith Laumer (1925–1993), The Infinite Cage
 Robert Lawson (1892–1957), Rabbit Hill
 David Leavitt (born 1961), The Lost Language of Cranes
 Lindsey Leavitt (born 1980)
 William Lederer (1912–2009), The Ugly American (with Eugene Burdick)
 Chang-Rae Lee (born 1965), Native Speaker
 Harper Lee (1926–2016), To Kill a Mockingbird
 Minnie Mary Lee (1825-1903)
 Peter Lefcourt (born 1941), The Dreyfus Affair
 Ella Leffland (born 1931), Rumors of Peace
 Dennis Lehane (born 1966), Mystic River
 Fritz Leiber (1910–1992), A Specter is Haunting Texas
 Murray Leinster (1896–1975), The Greks Bring Gifts
 Brad Leithauser (born 1953), Hence
 Madeleine L'Engle (1918–2007), A Wrinkle in Time
 F.J. Lennon (born 1964)
 J. Robert Lennon (born 1970), Mailman
 Elmore Leonard (1925–2013), Get Shorty
 JT LeRoy (Laura Albert) (born 1965), Sarah
 John Lescroart (born 1948), The Mercy Rule
 Jonathan Lethem (born 1964), Motherless Brooklyn
 Billie Letts (1938-2014), Where the Heart Is
 Jeremy Leven (born 1941), Satan: His Psychotherapy and Cure
 Ira Levin (1929–2007), Rosemary's Baby
 Meyer Levin (1905–1981), Compulsion
 Paul Levine (born 1948), To Speak for the Dead
 Stacey Levine (born 19??), Frances Johnson
 Janet Lewis (1899–1998), The Wife of Martin Guerre
 Sinclair Lewis (1885–1951), Main Street
 Ludwig Lewisohn (1882–1955), The Case of Mr. Crump
 Patricia Lieb (born 1942)
 Alan Lightman (born 1948), Einstein's Dreams
 Doris Lilly (1926–1991)
 Sigrid de Lima (1921–1999), Carnival by the Sea
 Tao Lin (born 1983), Richard Yates
 Joseph C. Lincoln (1870–1944), Rugged Water
 Johanna Lindsey (1952–2019), Fires of Winter
 Elizabeth Linington (1921–1988), Knave of Hearts
 Elinor Lipman (born 1950), The Pursuit of Alice Thrift
 George Lippard (1822–1854), The Quaker City, or The Monks of Monk Hall
 Rosina Lippi (born 1956), Homestead
 Laura Lippman (born 1959), What the Dead Know
 Sam Lipsyte (born 1968), Home Land
 Atticus Lish, Preparation for the Next Life
 David Liss (born 1966), A Conspiracy of Paper
 Robert Littell (born 1935), The Amateur
 Bentley Little (born 1960), The Revelation
 Liesel Litzenburger
 Harold Livingston (1924–2022), The Coasts of the Earth
 Ross Lockridge Jr. (1914–1948), Raintree County
 Patricia Lockwood (born 1982), No One Is Talking About This
 Saab Lofton
 Anne Logston (born 1962)
 Jack London (1876–1916), The Call of the Wild
 Frank Belknap Long (1901–1994), The Horror from the Hills
 Ki Longfellow (1944-2022), The Secret Magdalene
 Anita Loos (1893–1981), Gentlemen Prefer Blondes
 Bret Lott (born 1958), Jewel
 H. P. Lovecraft (1890–1937), At the Mountains of Madness
 Maud Hart Lovelace (1892–1980) Early Candlelight
 Lois Lowry (born 1937), The Giver
 Robert Ludlum (1927–2001), The Bourne Identity
 Amy Lukavics Daughters Unto Devils
 Grace Lumpkin (1891–1980), To Make My Bread
 Alison Lurie (1926–2020), Foreign Affairs
 Andrew Nelson Lytle (1902–1995), The Velvet Horn

M 

 Sarah J. Maas (born 1986), A Court of Thorns and Roses
 John D. MacDonald (1916–1986), The Deep Blue Good-by
 Ross Macdonald (1915–1983), The Moving Target
 Bonnie MacDougal
 Harold MacGrath (1871–1932), The Man on the Box
 Joyce MacIver
 Pauline Bradford Mackie (1873-?)
 Jay MacLarty (1943–2010)
 Norman Maclean (1902–1990), A River Runs Through It
 Sarah MacLean (born 1978), A Rogue By Any Other Name
 Charlotte MacLeod (1922–2005), The Corpse in Oozak's Pond
 Susan Elia MacNeal (born 1968)
 Gregory Maguire (born 1954), Wicked: The Life and Times of the Wicked Witch of the West
 Norman Mailer (1923–2007), The Naked and the Dead
 Charles Major (1856–1913), When Knighthood Was in Flower
 Rebecca Makkai (born 1978), The Great Believers
 Clarence Major (born 1936), Painted Turtle: Woman With Guitar
 Bernard Malamud (1914–1986), The Natural
 Thomas Mallon (born 1951), Henry and Clara
 Anne Mallory
 Barry N. Malzberg (born 1939), Beyond Apollo
 Frederick Manfred (1912–1994), Lord Grizzly
 David Manners (1900–1998)
 Lindsay Maracotta (born 1948)
 William March (1893–1954), The Bad Seed
 Marshall Ryan Maresca (born 1973)
 Dee Marie (born 19??), Sons of Avalon, Merlin’s Prophecy
 Margaret Maron (1938–2021), Bootlegger's Daughter
 John P. Marquand (1893–1960), The Late George Apley
 Carolyn Marsden (born 1950)
 Catherine Marshall (1914–1983), Christy
 Paule Marshall (1929–2019), Brown Girl, Brownstones
 George Madden Martin (1866–1946)
 George R. R. Martin (born 1948), A Game of Thrones
 Steve Martin (born 1945),  Shopgirl
 Valerie Martin (born 1948), Mary Reilly
 Carole Maso (born 1955), Defiance
 Bobbie Ann Mason (born 1940), In Country
 F. Van Wyck Mason (1901–1978), Three Harbours
 Richard Matheson (1926–2013), I Am Legend
 Harry Mathews (1930–2017), The Conversions
 Francine Matthews (born 1963)
 Frank C. Matthews (born 1972)
 Peter Matthiessen (1927–2014), At Play in the Fields of the Lord
 Armistead Maupin (born 1944), Tales of the City
 Evan Maxwell
 William Keepers Maxwell Jr. (1908–2000), Time Will Darken It
 Joyce Maynard (born 1953), To Die For
 Anne McCaffrey (1926–2011), Dragonflight
 Robert R. McCammon (born 1952), Boy's Life
 Cormac McCarthy (born 1933), All the Pretty Horses
 Mary McCarthy (1912–1989), The Group
 Ed McClanahan (1932–2021), Natural Man
 Jill McCorkle (born 1958), novelist and short story writer
 Horace McCoy (1897–1955), They Shoot Horses, Don't They?
 Sarah McCoy (born 1980)
 Elizabeth McCracken (born 1966), The Giant's House
 Sharyn McCrumb (born 1948), The Hangman's Beautiful Daughter
 Carson McCullers (1917–1967), The Heart Is a Lonely Hunter
 George Barr McCutcheon (1866–1928), Brewster's Millions
 Alice McDermott (born 1953), Charming Billy
 Gregory Mcdonald (1937–2008), Fletch
 Joseph McElroy (born 1930), A Smuggler's Bible
 William McFee (1881–1966), Casuals of the Sea
 William P. McGivern (1918–1982), Blondes Die Young
 Thomas McGuane (born 1939), Nothing But Blue Skies
 Jay McInerney (born 1955), Bright Lights, Big City
 Claude McKay (1890-1948), Romance in Marseille
 Richard McKenna (1913–1964), The Sand Pebbles
 Patricia McKillip (1948–2022), The Riddle-Master of Hed
 Reginald McKnight (born 1956), He Sleeps
 Patricia McLinn
 Janna McMahan
 James McManus (born 1951), Going to the Sun
 Terry McMillan (born 1951), Waiting to Exhale
 Larry McMurtry (1936–2021), Lonesome Dove
 Stephen W. Meader (1892–1977), Boy with a Pack
 Herman Melville (1819–1891), Moby-Dick
 Charles Mergendahl (1919–1959), The Bramble Bush
 Gordon Merrick (1916–1988), The Lord Won't Mind
 Barbara Mertz (1927-2013), Crocodile on the Sandbank
 Lynn Messina
 Claire Messud (born 1966), When the World Was Steady
 Grace Metalious (1924–1964), Peyton Place
 Philipp Meyer  (born 1974),
 Stephenie Meyer (born 1973), Twilight
 Leonard Michaels (1933–2003), The Men's Club
 Oscar Micheaux (1884–1951)
 DeLauné Michel
 James A. Michener (1907–1997), Tales of the South Pacific
 Mrs. Alex. McVeigh Miller (1850-1937) 
 Caroline Miller (1903–1992), Lamb in His Bosom
 Henry Miller (1891–1980), Tropic of Cancer
 Mary Miller
 May Merrill Miller (1894–1975)
 Rex Miller (1939–2004), Slob
 Sue Miller (born 1943), The Good Mother
 Susan Cummins Miller
 Walter M. Miller Jr. (1923–1996), A Canticle for Leibowitz
 Lydia Millet (born 1968), My Happy Life
 Steven Millhauser (born 1943), Martin Dressler
 David Milofsky
 Anchee Min (born 1957), Becoming Madame Mao
 Stephen Minot (1927–2010), Surviving the Flood
 Susan Minot (born 1956), Evening
 Meilin Miranda
 Jacquelyn Mitchard (born 1955), The Deep End of the Ocean
 Donald Grant Mitchell (1822–1908), Dr. Johns
 Margaret Mitchell (1900–1949), Gone with the Wind
 S. Weir Mitchell (1829–1914), Hugh Wynne, Free Quaker
 Sam Moffie (born 1960)
 Carol Moldaw (born 1956)
 N. Scott Momaday (born 1934), House Made of Dawn
 Adrienne Monson (born 1983)
 Martha Moody (born 1955)
 Rick Moody (born 1961), The Ice Storm
 Christopher Moore (born 1957), Lamb: The Gospel According to Biff, Christ's Childhood Pal
 Lorrie Moore (born 1957), Who Will Run the Frog Hospital?
 Ruth Moore (1903–1989), Spoonhandle
 Susanna Moore (born 1947), In the Cut
 Ward Moore (1903–1978), Bring the Jubilee
 A. R. Morlan (1958-2016)
 Christopher Morley (1890–1957), Kitty Foyle
 Mary McGarry Morris (born 1943), Songs In Ordinary Time
 Rooster Morris (born 1955), Axle Galench and the Gate of No Return, Axle Galench in Search of Barnsfoggon
 Wright Morris (1910–1998), Plains Song
 Toni Morrison (1931–2019), Beloved
 Bradford Morrow (born 1951), Trinity Fields
 Honoré Willsie Morrow (1880-1940), The Great Captain trilogy
 James Morrow (born 1947), Towing Jehovah
 Howard Frank Mosher (1942–2017), A Stranger in the Kingdom
 Ottessa Moshfegh (born 1981), My Year of Rest and Relaxation
 Hannah Moskowitz (born 1991)
 Stefan Mosley (born 1952)
 Walter Mosley (born 1952), Devil in a Blue Dress
 Dow Mossman (born 1944), The Stones of Summer
 Willard Motley (1912–1965), Knock on Any Door
 Bharati Mukherjee (1940–2017), Jasmine
 Clarence E. Mulford (1883–1956), Hopalong Cassidy
 Marcia Muller (born 1944), Wolf in the Shadows
 Mary Noailles Murfree (1850–1922), The Amulet
 Sabina Murray (born 1968), A Carnivore's Inquiry
 John Myers Myers (1906–1988), Silverlock
 Anton Myrer (1922–1996), Once an Eagle

N 

 Vladimir Nabokov (1899–1977), Lolita
 Robert Nathan (1894–1985), Portrait of Jennie
 Gloria Naylor (1950–2016), The Women of Brewster Place
 Shira Nayman (born 1960)
 John Neal (1793–1876), Rachel Dyer: a North American Story
 Antonya Nelson (born 1961), Talking in Bed
 Howard Nemerov (1920–1991), The Homecoming Game
 Arthur Nersesian (born 1958), The Fuck-Up
 Katherine Neville (born 1945), The Eight
 Fae Myenne Ng (born 1957), Bone
 John Nichols (born 1940), The Milagro Beanfield War
 Kerry Nietz
 Anaïs Nin (1903–1977), A Spy in the House of Love
 Larry Niven (born 1938), Ringworld
 Lewis Nordan (1939–2012), The Sharpshooter Blues
 Charles Nordhoff (1887–1947), Mutiny on the Bounty (with James Norman Hall)
 Gurney Norman (born 1937), Divine Right's Trip
 Howard Norman (born 1949), The Bird Artist
 John Norman (born 1931), Tarnsman of Gor
 Charles Gilman Norris (1881–1945), Bricks Without Straw
 Frank Norris (1870–1902), McTeague
 Kathleen Norris (1880–1966), Second Hand Wife
 Harold Norse (1916–2009), Beat Hotel
 Andre Norton (1912–2005), The Witch World
 Craig Nova (born 1945), The Good Son
 Josip Novakovich (born 1956), April Fool's Day
 Mark Nykanen

O 

 Joyce Carol Oates (born 1938), them
 Tim O'Brien (born 1946), Going After Cacciato
 Edwin O'Connor (1918–1968), The Last Hurrah
 Flannery O'Connor (1925–1964), The Violent Bear It Away
 Varley O'Connor
 Shawn Thomas Odyssey
 Marie Conway Oemler (1879–1932)
 Chris Offutt (born 1958), The Good Brother
 Margaret Astrid Lindholm Ogden (born 1952), writes as Robin Hobb & Megan Lindholm
 John O'Hara (1905–1970), Appointment in Samarra
 Bayo Ojikutu (born 1971), Free Burning
 Daniel Olivas (born 1959), The Book of Want
 Lauren Oliver (born 1982), Delirium
 Robert Olmstead (born 1954), A Trail of Heart's Blood Wherever We Go
 Stewart O'Nan (born 1961), The Speed Queen
 Tommy Orange (born 1982), There There
 Terry Oroszi (born 1966)
 Julie Orringer (born 1973), The Invisible Bridge
 Martha Ostenso (1900–1963), Wild Geese
 Fannie Ostrander (1859–1921)
 Vincent O'Sullivan (1869–1940), The Green Window
 Rodrigues Ottolengui (1861–1937), An Artist in Crime
 Iris Owens (1929–2008), After Claude
 Janis Owens (born 1960)
 Ruth Ozeki (born 1956), A Tae for the Time Being
 Cynthia Ozick (born 1928), The Puttermesser Papers

P 

 Alison Pace
 William C. Pack
 William Packard (1933–2002), Saturday Night at San Marcos
 Thomas Nelson Page (1853–1952), On Newfound River
 Michelle Paisley
 Bernadette Pajer, Professor Bradshaw Mysteries
 Chuck Palahniuk (born 1962), Fight Club
 Allison Pang
 Edgar Pangborn (1909–1976), Davy
 Alexei Panshin (born 1940), Rite of Passage
 Sara Paretsky (born 1947), Indemnity Only
 Jay Parini (born 1948), The Last Station
 Jane Marsh Parker (1836-1913), The Midnight Cry
 Robert B. Parker (1932–2010), Crimson Joy
 T. Jefferson Parker (born 1953), Laguna Heat
 Anne Parrish (1888–1957), The Perennial Bachelor
 Ann Patchett (born 1963), Bel Canto
 James Patterson (born 1947), Along Came a Spider
 Lisa Patton (born 1958) Whistlin' Dixie in a Nor'easter
 Paul Jessup  (born 1977),
 Elliot Paul (1891–1958), Concert Pitch
 James Kirke Paulding (1778–1860), The Dutchman's Fireside
 Gary Paulsen (1939–2021), Hatchet
 Bill Pearson (born 1938), Drifter's Detour
 Ridley Pearson (born 1953), Undercurrents
 T. R. Pearson (born 1956), Blue Ridge
 Howard Pease (1894–1974), The Tod Moran Mysteries
 Robert Newton Peck (1928–2020), A Day No Pigs Would Die
 Laura Pedersen (born 1965), Hallie Palmer
 Ern Pedler (1914–1989)
 Janet Peery (born 195?), The River Beyond the World
 Don Pendleton (1927–1995), War Against the Mafia
 Walker Percy (1916–1990), The Moviegoer
 Frank E. Peretti (born 1951), This Present Darkness
 Marisha Pessl (born 1977), Special Topics in Calamity Physics
 Julia Peterkin (1880–1961), Scarlet Sister Mary
 Ann Petry (1931–1997), The Narrows
 Arthur Phillips (born 1969), Prague
 David Graham Phillips (1867–1911), Susan Lenox (Her Fall and Rise)
 Jayne Anne Phillips (born 1952), Machine Dreams
 Hannah Maynard Pickard (1812-1844) 
 Jodi Picoult (born 1966), The Pact
 Marge Piercy (born 1936), He, She And It
 Mary Hayden Green Pike (1824–1898), Ida May
 Darryl Pinckney (born 1953), High Cotton
 Josephine Pinckney (1895–1957), Three O'Clock Dinner
 Daniel Pinkwater (born 1941), The Snarkout Boys and the Avocado of Death
 H. Beam Piper (1904–1964), Little Fuzzy
 Sylvia Plath (1932–1963), The Bell Jar
 George Plimpton (1927–2003), The Curious Case of Sidd Finch
 Michael Pocalyko (born 1954), The Navigator
 Edgar Allan Poe (1809–1849), The Narrative of Arthur Gordon Pym of Nantucket
 Frederik Pohl (1919–2013), Gateway
 Donald Ray Pollock (born 1954), The Devil All the Time
 Darryl Ponicsan (born 1938), The Last Detail
 Ernest Poole (1880–1950), His Family
 William Lee Popham (1885–1953)
 Eleanor H. Porter (1868–1920), Pollyanna
 Katherine Anne Porter (1890–1980), Ship of Fools
 Rose Porter (1845-1906), Summer Drift-Wood for the Winter Fire
 Charles Portis (1933–2020), True Grit
 Melville Davisson Post (1871–1930), The Nameless Thing
 Chaim Potok (1929–2002), The Chosen
 Jean Potts (1910–1999), Go, Lovely Rose
 Jerry Pournelle (1933–2017), The Endless Frontier
 Dawn Powell (1896–1965), The Wicked Pavilion
 Padgett Powell (born 1952), Edisto
 Richard P. Powell (1908–1999), The Philadelphian
 J. F. Powers (1917–1999), Morte d'Urban
 Richard Powers (born 1957), The Gold Bug Variations
 Emily Prager (born 1952), Clea & Zeus Divorce
 Theodore Pratt (1901–1969), Mr. Limpet
 Douglas Preston (born 1956), Relic
 Charles F. Price (born 1938)
 Eugenia Price (1916–1996), The Beloved Invader
 Nicholas A. Price (born 1962), Adventures in Trichology
 Reynolds Price (1933–2011), Kate Vaiden
 Richard Price (born 1949), Freedomland
 Joseph Di Prisco
 Frederic Prokosch (1908–1989), The Seven Who Fled
 Bill Pronzini (born 1943), Hoodwink
 Francine Prose (born 1947), Blue Angel
 E. Annie Proulx (born 1935), The Shipping News
 Olive Higgins Prouty (1882–1974), Stella Dallas
 James Purdy (1923–2009), Cabot Wright Begins
 Mario Puzo (1920–1999), The Godfather
 Thomas Pynchon (born 1937), Gravity's Rainbow

Q 

 Qiu Xiaolong (born 1953), Death of a Red Heroine
 Jamie Quatro
 Ellery Queen (Frederic Dannay (1905–1982) and Manfred B. Lee (1905–1971)), The Greek Coffin Mystery
 John Herbert Quick (1861–1925), Vandemark's Folly
 Anna Quindlen (born 1952), Black and Blue
 Daniel Quinn (1935–2018), Ishmael
 Julia Quinn (born 1970), The Duke and I

R 

 Kris Radish (born 1953)
 Lulah Ragsdale (1861-1953), Miss Dulcie from Dixie
 Ayn Rand (1905–1982), Atlas Shrugged
 Alice Randall (born 1959), The Wind Done Gone
 Rebecca Rasmussen
 Marjorie Kinnan Rawlings (1896–1953), The Yearling
 Wilson Rawls (1913–1984), Where the Red Fern Grows
 Chet Raymo (born 1936), The Dork of Cork
 John Rechy (born 1931), City of Night
 Jaclyn Reding (born 1966), The Secret Gift
 Ishmael Reed (born 1938), Mumbo Jumbo
 Arthur B. Reeve (1880–1936), Craig Kennedy Listens In
 Ben Rehder
 Kathy Reichs (born 1950), Déjà Dead
 Thomas Mayne Reid (1818–1883), The Rifle Rangers
 Emma May Alexander Reinertsen (1853–1920), Five Cousins in California
 Amanda Renee
 Nina Revoyr (born 1969), Southland
 Sheri Reynolds (born 1967), The Rapture of Canaan
 Eugene Manlove Rhodes (1869–1934), Bransford in Arcadia
 Anne Rice (1941–2021), Interview with the Vampire
 Craig Rice (1908–1957), The Corpse Steps Out
 E. J. Richmond (1825–1918), The Jewelled Serpent
 Conrad Richter (1890–1968), The Town
 Mary Roberts Rinehart (1876–1958), The Circular Staircase
 Caris Roane
 Ronald Clair Roat (1946–2013)
 Harold Robbins (1916–1997), The Carpetbaggers
 Tom Robbins (born 1936), Even Cowgirls Get the Blues
 Elizabeth Madox Roberts (1881–1941), The Great Meadow
 Kenneth Roberts (1885–1957), Northwest Passage
 Nora Roberts (born 1950), Irish Thoroughbred
 Kim Stanley Robinson (born 1952), Red Mars
 Marilynne Robinson (born 1943), Housekeeping
 Mary Robison (born 1949), Why Did I Ever
 Lucia St. Clair Robson (born 1942), Ride the Wind
 Tony R. Rodriguez
 Edward Payson Roe (1838–1888), Barriers Burned Away
 Lettie Hamlet Rogers (1917–1957)
 Joel Townsley Rogers (1896-1984), The Red Right Hand
 Sharon Carter Rogers
 Adelaide Day Rollston (1854-1941)
 O. E. Rølvaag (1876–1931), Giants in the Earth
 Judith Rossner (1935–2005), Looking for Mr. Goodbar
 Leo Rosten (1908–1997), Captain Newman, M.D.
 Henry Roth (1906–1995), Call It Sleep
 Philip Roth (1933–2018), Portnoy's Complaint
 Veronica Roth (born 1988), Divergent
 Susanna Rowson (1762–1824), Charlotte Temple
 S. J. Rozan (born 1950), Winter and Night
 Robert Ruark (1915–1965), Uhuru
 Jack Rudloe (born 1943), Potluck
 Rudy Ruiz, The Resurrection of Fulgencio Ramirez: A Novel
 Norman Rush (born 1933), Mating
 Rebecca Rush (1779–1850), Kelroy
 Joanna Russ (1937–2011), The Female Man
Karen Russell (born 1981), Swamplandia!
 Gerri Russell (born 1962), The Warrior Trainer
 Mary Doria Russell (born 1950), The Sparrow
 Richard Russo (born 1949), Empire Falls
Carl Hancock Rux, Asphalt
 Marah Ellis Ryan (1860–1934), Told in the Hills

S 

 Seth Grahame-Smith (born 1976)
 Hubert Selby Jr. (1928–2004), Last Exit to Brooklyn
 Noel Everingham Sainsbury (1884–1955)
 J. D. Salinger (1919–2010), The Catcher in the Rye
 James Sallis (born 1944), Long-Legged Fly
 James Salter (1925–2015), A Sport and a Pastime
 Edgar Saltus (1855–1921), Mr. Incoul's Misadventure
 Lawrence Sanders (1920–1998), The Anderson Tapes
 John Sandford (born 1944), Rules of Prey
 Mari Sandoz (1896–1966), Slogum House
 Colin Sargent (born 1954), Museum of Human Beings
 William Saroyan (1908–1981), The Human Comedy
 May Sarton (1912–1995), Faithful are the Wounds
 Richard Satterlie
 John Saul (born 1942), Suffer the Children
 George Saunders (born 1958), The Brief and Frightening Reign of Phil
 Willard Savoy (1916–1976)
 John Sayles (born 1950), Pride of the Bimbos
 Jack Schaefer (1907–1991), Shane
 Rebecca Scherm
 Cathleen Schine (born 1953), Rameau's Niece
 Mark Schorer (1908–1977), A House Too Old
 Melissa Schroeder
 Budd Schulberg (1914–2009), What Makes Sammy Run?
 Christine Schutt (born 19??), All Souls
 Victoria Schwab (born 1987), Vicious
 Lynne Sharon Schwartz (born 1939), Disturbances in the Field
 Sandra Scofield (born 1943), Beyond Deserving
 Sandra Scoppettone (born 1936), Suzuki Beane
 Daniel Scott (born 1963), Valedictory
 Evelyn Scott (1893–1963), A Calendar of Sin
 Joanna Scott (born 1960), The Manikin
 Allan Seager (1906–1968), Amos Berry
 Molly Elliot Seawell (1860–1916), The House of Egremont
 Alice Sebold (born 1963), The Lovely Bones
 Catharine Sedgwick (1789–1867), Hope Leslie
 Carolyn See (1934–2016), Making History
 Erich Segal (1937–2010), Love Story
 Lore Segal (born 1928), Other People's Houses
 Danzy Senna (born 1970), Caucasia (novel)
 Richard Setlowe
 Anya Seton (1904–1990), Green Darkness
 Mary Lee Settle (1918–2005), Blood Tie
 Elizabeth Sewell (1919–2001)
 Michael Shaara (1928–1988), The Killer Angels
 Laurence Shames (born 1951), Florida Straits
 Ntozake Shange (1948–2018), Betsey Brown
 Emma Augusta Sharkey (1858–1902), The Richmond Secret
 Akhil Sharma (born 1971), An Obedient Father
 Irwin Shaw (1913–1984), Rich Man, Poor Man
 Robert Shea (1933–1994), The Illuminatus! Trilogy (with Robert Anton Wilson)
 Amy Shearn (born 1979)
 Wilfrid Sheed (1930–2011), Square's Progress
 Anna Sheehan
 Sidney Sheldon (1917–2007), The Naked Face
 Samuel Shellabarger (1888–1954), Captain from Castile
 Jim Shepard (born 1956), Lights Out in the Reptile House
 Carol Shields (1935–2003), The Stone Diaries
 Anita Shreve (1946–2018), The Weight of Water
 Susan Richards Shreve (born 1939), A Country of Strangers
 Lionel Shriver (born 1957), We Need to Talk About Kevin
 Gary Shteyngart (born 1972), The Russian Debutante's Handbook
 Anne Rivers Siddons (1936–2019), Peachtree Road
 Clancy Sigal (1926–2017), Going Away
 Leslie Marmon Silko (born 1948), Ceremony
 Robert Silverberg (born 1935), A Time of Changes
 Clifford D. Simak (1904–1988), City
 Dan Simmons (born 1948), Hyperion
 William Gilmore Simms (1806–1870), The Sword and the Distaff
 Mona Simpson (born 1957), Anywhere But Here
 Elizabeth Sims (born 1957), Damn Straight
 Upton Sinclair (1878–1968), The Jungle
 Isaac Bashevis Singer (1902–1991), Enemies, a Love Story
 Israel Joshua Singer (1893–1944), The Brothers Ashkenazi
 Joan Slonczewski (born 1956), A Door into Ocean
 Jane Smiley (born 1949), A Thousand Acres
 Betty Smith (1896–1972), A Tree Grows in Brooklyn
 E. E. Smith (1890–1965), First Lensman
 Elizabeth Oakes Smith (1806–1893), The Western Captive
 Francis Hopkinson Smith (1838–1915), Colonel Carter of Cartersville
 H. Allen Smith (1907–1976), Rhubarb
 Haywood Smith
 Katy Simpson Smith (born 1985)
 Lee Smith (born 1944), Fair and Tender Ladies
 Thorne Smith (1892–1934), Topper
 Charles A. Smythwick
 Zilpha Keatley Snyder (1927–2014), The Headless Cupid
 Paul Spencer Sochaczewski (born 1947), Redheads
 Susan Sontag (1933–2004), In America
 Virginia Sorensen (1912–1991), On This Star
 Christopher Sorrentino (born 1963), Trance
 Gilbert Sorrentino (1929–2006), Mulligan Stew
 Gary Soto (born 1952), Buried Onions
 Terry Southern (1924–1995), The Magic Christian
 E. D. E. N. Southworth (1819–1899), The Hidden Hand
 W. M. Spackman (1905–1980), An Armful of Warm Girl
 Joshua Spanogle
 R. Clifton Spargo
 Frank H. Spearman (1859–1937), Whispering Smith
 Scott Spencer (born 1945), Endless Love
 Mickey Spillane (1918–2006), I, the Jury
 Norman Spinrad (born 1940), The Iron Dream
 Harriet Elizabeth Prescott Spofford (1835–1921), Sir Rohan's Ghost
 David Derek Stacton (1925–1968), On a Balcony
 Jean Stafford (1915–1979), Boston Adventure
 Zoje Stage, Baby Teeth
 Clinton H. Stagg (1888–1916)
 Jason Starr (born 1966),  The Follower
 Kai Starr
 Danielle Steel (born 1947), Family Album
 Wallace Stegner (1909–1993), Angle of Repose
 Gertrude Stein (1874–1946), The Autobiography of Alice B. Toklas
 John Steinbeck (1902–1968), The Grapes of Wrath
 Darcey Steinke (born 1964), Jesus Saves
 Ann Sophia Stephens (1810–1886), Malaeska: The Indian Wife of the White Hunter
 Harold Stephens (1926–2021), Who Needs A Road?
 Neal Stephenson (born 1959), Snow Crash
 Bruce Sterling (born 1954), Islands in the Net
 Richard G. Stern (1928–2013), Golk
 Steve Stern, The Angel of Forgetfulness
 Brooke Stevens, Tattoo Girl
 George R. Stewart (1895–1980), Earth Abides
 Frederic Jesup Stimson (1855–1943), The Crime of Henry Vane
 R. L. Stine (born 1943), Monster Blood
 Frank R. Stockton (1834–1902), Rudder Grange
 Mary Stolz (1920–2006), The Edge of Next Year
 Grace Zaring Stone (1891–1991), The Bitter Tea of General Yen
 Irving Stone (1903–1989), The Agony and the Ecstasy
 Robert Stone (1937–2015), Dog Soldiers
 Phil Stong (1899–1957), State Fair
 Hans Otto Storm (1895–1941), Pity the Tyrant
 Rex Stout (1886–1975), Fer-de-Lance
 Harriet Beecher Stowe (1811–1896), Uncle Tom's Cabin
 Edward Stratemeyer (1862–1930), The Rover Boys At School
 Gene Stratton-Porter (1863–1924), A Girl of the Limberlost
 Peter Straub (born 1943), Ghost Story
 Darin Strauss (born 1970), The Real McCoy
 Edward Streeter (1891–1976), Father of the Bride
 John Strelecky (born 1969), The Big Five For Life - Leadership's Greatest Secret
 T. S. Stribling (1881–1965), The Store
 Elizabeth Strout (born 1956), Amy and Isabelle
 Jesse Stuart (1906–1984), Taps for Private Tussie
 Theodore Sturgeon (1918–1985), More Than Human
 William Styron (1925–2006), The Confessions of Nat Turner
 Ronald Sukenick (1932–2004), Up
 Cid Ricketts Sumner (1890–1970), Quality
 Jacqueline Susann (1918–1974), Valley of the Dolls
 Van Tassel Sutphen (1861–1945)
 Harvey Swados (1920–1972), Out Went the Candle
 Glendon Swarthout (1918–1992), The Shootist

T 

 Gladys Taber (1899–1980), Stillmeadow books
 Karin Tabke
 Michael Talbot (1953–1992), The Bog
 Elizabeth Tallent (born 1954), Museum Pieces
 Amy Tan (born 1952), The Joy Luck Club
 Jason Tanamor (born 1975), Vampires of Portlandia
 Booth Tarkington (1869–1946), The Magnificent Ambersons
 Donna Tartt (born 1963), The Secret History
 Bayard Taylor (1825–1878), Hanna Thurston
 Kathrine Taylor (1903–1996), Address Unknown
 Peter Taylor (1917–1994), A Summons to Memphis
 Phoebe Atwood Taylor (1909–1976), The Cape Cod Mystery
 Robert Lewis Taylor (1912–1998), The Travels of Jaimie McPheeters
 William Tenn (1920–2010), Of Men and Monsters
 Tabitha Gilman Tenney (1762–1837),
 Mary Virginia Terhune (1830–1922), Alone
 Kathleen Tessaro (born 1965), Rare Objects
 Walter Tevis (1928–1984), The Hustler
 Steve Thayer (born 1953)
 Paul Theroux (born 1941), The Mosquito Coast
 Angie Thomas (born 1988), The Hate U Give
 Daniel Pierce Thompson (1795–1868), The Green Mountain Boys
 Hunter S. Thompson (1937–2005), Fear and Loathing in Las Vegas
 Jim Thompson (1906–1977), The Killer Inside Me
 Maurice Thompson (1844–1901), Alice of Old Vincennes
 Melanie Rae Thon (born 1957), Meteors in August
 James Thurber (1894–1961), The 13 Clocks
 Marian Thurm (born 1952)
 Wallace Thurman (1902–1934), The Blacker the Berry
 Ernest Tidyman (1928–1984), Shaft
 Ronald Tierney (1944–2017)
 Ada Josephine Todd (1858-1904), The Vacation Club
 Caroline and Charles Todd
 John Kennedy Toole (1937–1969), A Confederacy of Dunces
 Jane Toombs (died 2014)
 Jean Toomer (1894–1967), Cane
 Joseph Torchia (1948–1996)
 Aaron Louis Tordini
 Alessandra Torre
 Nick Tosches (1949–2019), In the Hand of Dante
 Paul A. Toth
 Albion W. Tourgée (1838–1905), A Fool's Errand
 Arthur Train (1875–1945), Yankee Lawyer: The Autobiography of Ephraim Tutt
 Clara Augusta Jones Trask (1839–1905) Patience Pettigrew's perplexities
 Lawrence Treat (1903–1998), V as in Victim
 Trevanian (1931–2005), The Eiger Sanction
 Emma Trevayne
 Calvin Trillin (born 1935), Runestruck
 Dalton Trumbo (1905–1976), Johnny Got His Gun
 Danielle Trussoni (1973), "Angelology"
 George Tucker (1775–1861), A Voyage to the Moon
 John R. Tunis (1889–1975), The Kid From Tomkinsville
 Scott Turow (born 1949), Presumed Innocent
 Harry Turtledove (born 1949), In the Balance
 Mark Twain (1835–1910), Adventures of Huckleberry Finn
 Anne Tyler (born 1941), The Accidental Tourist
 Royall Tyler (1757–1826), The Algerine Captive

U 

 Brady Udall (born c. 1971), The Miracle Life of Edgar Mint
 Dorothy Uhnak (1933–2006), The Bait
 James Michael Ullman (1925–1997), The Neon Haystack
 James Ramsey Ullman (1907–1971)
 Douglas Unger (born 1952), Leaving the Land
 John Updike (1932–2009), Rabbit, Run
 Leon Uris (1924–2003), Exodus
 Luís Alberto Urrea (born 1955), In Search of Snow
 Lois Utz (1932–1986)

V 

 S. S. Van Dine (1888–1939), The Benson Murder Case
 Andrew Vachss (1942–2021), Flood
 Roberto Valero (1955–1994)
 Jack Vance (1916–2013), The Killing Machine
 Louis Joseph Vance (1879–1933), The Lone Wolf
 John Varley (born 1947), The Ophiuchi Hotline
 Michael Vatikiotis (born 1957)
 Gore Vidal (1925–2012), Burr
 Tony Vigorito, Nine Kinds of Naked
 Gerald Vizenor (born 1934), Darkness in Saint Louis Bearheart
 William T. Vollmann (born 1959), Europe Central
 Kurt Vonnegut Jr. (1922–2007), Slaughterhouse-Five

W 

 David Wagoner (1926–2021), The Escape Artist
 Alice Walker (born 1944), The Color Purple
 Margaret Walker (1915–1998), Jubilee
 David Foster Wallace (1962–2008), Infinite Jest
 Irving Wallace (1916–1990), The Fan Club
 Lew Wallace (1827–1905), Ben-Hur
 Edward Lewis Wallant (1926–1962), The Tenants of Moonbloom
 Robert James Waller (1939–2017), The Bridges of Madison County
 Douglass Wallop (1920–1985), The Year the Yankees Lost the Pennant
 Joseph Wambaugh (born 1937), The Choirboys
 Walter Wangerin Jr. (1944–2017), The Book of the Dun Cow
 Elizabeth Stuart Phelps Ward (1844–1911), The Gates Ajar
 Jesmyn Ward (born 1977), Salvage the Bones
 William Ware (1797–1852), Zenobia; or, The Fall of Palmyra
 Catherine Anne Warfield (1816–1877), The Household of Bouverie
 Charles Dudley Warner (1829–1900), The Gilded Age (with Mark Twain)
 Gertrude Chandler Warner (1890–1979), The Boxcar Children
 Susan Warner (1819–1895), The Wide, Wide World
 Kimberly Warner-Cohen (born 1978)
 Robert Penn Warren (1905–1989), All the King's Men
 Larry Watson (born 1947), Montana 1948
 Kate Watterson
 Hillary Waugh (1920–2008), Last Seen Wearing...
 John Van Alstyne Weaver (1893–1938)
 Will Weaver (born 1950), Red Earth, White Earth
 Charles Webb (1939–2020), The Graduate
 Katharine Weber (born 1955), Triangle
 Jean Webster (1876–1916), Daddy-Long-Legs
 Theodore Weesner (1935–2015), The Car Thief
 Jerome Weidman (1913–1998), I Can Get It for You Wholesale
 James Welch (1940–2003), Fools Crow
 Manly Wade Wellman (1903–1986), The Old Gods Waken
 Rebecca Wells (born 1952), Divine Secrets of the Ya-Ya Sisterhood
 Eudora Welty (1909–2001), The Optimist's Daughter
 Glenway Wescott (1901–1987), The Grandmothers
 Debbie Lee Wesselmann
 Dorothy West (1907–1998), The Living Is Easy
 Jessamyn West (1902–1984), The Massacre at Fall Creek
 Nathanael West (1903–1940), The Day of the Locust
 Paul West (1930–2015), The Women of Whitechapel and Jack the Ripper
 Donald E. Westlake (1933–2008), God Save the Mark
 Edith Wharton (1862–1937), The Age of Innocence
 William Wharton (1925–2008), Birdy
 E. B. White (1899–1985), Charlotte's Web
 Edmund White (born 1940), A Boy's Own Story
 Randy Wayne White (born 1950), Sanibel Flats
 Stewart Edward White (1873–1946), The Claim Jumpers
 Colson Whitehead (born 1969), The Intuitionist
 Brand Whitlock (1869–1934), The Turn of the Balance
 Phyllis A. Whitney (1903–2008), The Mystery of the Haunted Pool
 Edward Whittemore (1933–1995), Sinai Tapestry
 John Edgar Wideman (born 1941), Philadelphia Fire
 Elie Wiesel (1928–2016), Twilight
 Kate Douglas Wiggin (1856–1923), Rebecca of Sunnybrook Farm
 Marianne Wiggins (born 1947), Evidence of Things Unseen
 James Wilcox (born 1949), Modern Baptists
 Laura Ingalls Wilder (1867–1957), Little House on the Prairie
 Thornton Wilder (1897–1975), The Bridge of San Luis Rey
 Kate Wilhelm (1928–2018), Where Late the Sweet Birds Sang
 Christopher Willard (born 1960), Garbage Head
 Charles Willeford (1919–1988), Miami Blues
 Ben Ames Williams (1889–1953), House Divided
 John A. Williams (1925–2015), The Man Who Cried I Am
 John Williams (1922–1994), Stoner
 Joy Williams (born 1944), State of Grace
 Philip Lee Williams (born 1950), Elegies for the Water
 Tennessee Williams (1911–1983), The Roman Spring of Mrs. Stone
 Thomas Williams (1926–1990), The Hair of Harold Roux
 Jack Williamson (1908–2006), The Humanoid Touch
 Calder Willingham (1922–1995), End As a Man
 Connie Willis (born 1945), Doomsday Book
 Harriet E. Wilson (1825–1900), Our Nig; or Sketches from the Life of a Free Black
 Harry Leon Wilson (1867–1919), Ruggles of Red Gap
 Margaret Wilson (1882–1973), The Able McLaughlins
 Robert Anton Wilson (1932–2007), The Illuminatus! Trilogy (with Robert Shea)
 Sloan Wilson (1920–2003), The Man in the Gray Flannel Suit
 Mark Winegardner (born 1961), Crooked River Burning
 Crystal Lacey Winslow
 Don Winslow (born 1953), The Power of the Dog
 Theodore Winthrop (1828–1861), John Brent
 Owen Wister (1860–1938), The Virginian
 Larry Woiwode (1941–2022), Beyond the Bedroom Wall
 Gene Wolfe (1931–2019), The Book of the New Sun
 Thomas Wolfe (1900–1938), Look Homeward, Angel
 Tom Wolfe (1931–2018), The Bonfire of the Vanities
 Geoffrey Wolff (born 1937), Providence
 Tobias Wolff (born 1945), The Barracks Thief
 Hilma Wolitzer (born 1930), Silver
 Meg Wolitzer (born 1959), This Is Your Life
 Ramsay Wood (born 1943), Kalila and Dimna
 Daniel Woodrell (born 1953), Give Us a Kiss
 Samuel Woodworth (1784–1842), The Champions of Freedom
 Cornell Woolrich (1903–1968), The Bride Wore Black
 Constance Fenimore Woolson (1840–1894), For the Major
 Herman Wouk (1915–2019), The Caine Mutiny
 Austin Tappan Wright (1883–1931), Islandia
 Ernest Vincent Wright (c. 1873–1939), Gadsby
 Harold Bell Wright (1872–1944), The Shepherd of the Hills
 Kirby Wright (born 1955), Punahou Blues
 Mary Tappan Wright (1851–1917), Aliens
 Richard Wright (1908–1960), Native Son
 Stephen Wright (born 1946), The Amalgamation Polka

X 

 Xu Xi (born 1954), The Unwalled City

Y 

 Irvin D. Yalom (born 1931), When Nietzsche Wept
 Lois-Ann Yamanaka (born 1961), Wild Meat and the Bully Burgers
 Karen Tei Yamashita (born 1951), Through the Arc of the Rain Forest
 Chelsea Quinn Yarbro (born 1942), Hotel Transylvania
 Steve Yarbrough (born 1956), The Oxygen Man
 Richard Yates (1926–1992), Revolutionary Road
 Frank Yerby (1916–1991), Judas, My Brother
 Anzia Yezierska (c. 1880–1970), Bread Givers
 Rafael Yglesias (born 1954), Fearless
 Mako Yoshikawa (born 1966), One Hundred and One Ways
 Al Young (1939–2021), Ask Me Now
 Stark Young (1881–1963), So Red the Rose
 Michele Young-Stone

Z 

 Rafi Zabor (born 1946), The Bear Comes Home
 Roger Zelazny (1937–1995), Lord of Light
 Paul Zindel (1936–2003), The Pigman
 Nell Zink, The Wallcreeper
 Leane Zugsmith (1903–1969), All Victories Are Alike

See also 

 "The Great American Novel"
 American literature
 Colonial American literature
 Southern literature
 African American literature
 Jewish American literature
 LGBT literature
 Lists of writers
 List of short story authors
 List of novelists by nationality
 List of women writers
 List of African-American writers
 List of Asian-American writers
 List of Jewish American authors
 List of writers from peoples indigenous to the Americas
 Awards
 Pulitzer Prize for the Novel (1918–1947)
 Pulitzer Prize for Fiction (1948 to present)
 National Book Award
 Bestsellers
 Publishers Weekly lists of bestselling novels in the United States (The top ten each year from 1900 to 2008)

References 
 Nelson, Emmanuel S. Asian American Novelists: A Bio-Bibliographical Critical Sourcebook.  Westport: Greenwood Press, 2000)

Specific

Novelists from the United States
American